The Ozark Highlands AVA is an American Viticultural Area located in southern Missouri in the Ozark Mountains.  The appellation includes land from just east of Jefferson City in the north to the Eleven Point River in the south, including parts of Phelps, Maries, Osage, Gasconade, Franklin, Crawford, Shannon, Dent, Texas, Reynolds, and Pulaski counties.  The AVA was established in 1987.
Contained entirely within the larger Ozark Mountain AVA, the area is drier than other parts of the state, but the soil of sandy loam and clay retains moisture well.  The first grapevines in the Ozark Highlands were planted by Italian immigrants. All variety of grapes are grown in the area, including Vitis vinifera, Vitis labrusca, and French hybrids.

See also
St. James Winery

References

External links
 Meramec River Wine Trail

American Viticultural Areas
Italian-American culture in Missouri
Missouri wine
1987 establishments in Missouri